Arthur H. Vinal (July 1, 1855 – August 25, 1923) was an American architect who lived and worked in Boston, Massachusetts. Vinal was born in Quincy, Massachusetts on July 1, 1855 to Howard Vinal and Clarissa J. Wentworth. Vinal apprenticed at the firm of Peabody & Stearns in Boston before leaving to start his own practice in 1875. Vinal started a partnership with Henry F. Starbuck in 1877; the firm broke up when Starbuck moved away. Vinal served as the first City Architect of Boston from 1884 to 1887. Vinal is principally known for his Richardsonian Romanesque High Service Building at the Chestnut Hill Reservoir (1887). In addition to his other public buildings, Vinal designed numerous residences in Boston and nearby suburbs (not all, or even mostly, romanesques).

Other works
 Methodist Church, Farmington, Maine (1877)
 Bangor Opera House, Bangor, Maine (1881)
 23 Warren Avenue, Boston, MA (1881)
 29 Melville Avenue, Dorchester, MA, shingle style, (1884)
 35 Melville Avenue, Dorchester, MA was built and designed by and for Arthur H. Vinal in 1882. By 1894, a W.T. Sullivan lived here. 
 37 Melville Avenue, Dorchester, MA was designed by Arthur H. Vinal c. mid 1880s. By 1894, its owner was Sophia B. Adams. 
 Mt. Kineo House Hotel, Mount Kineo, Moosehead Lake, Maine (opened July 29, 1884)
 Back Bay fire and police station, 941–955 Boylston Street, Boston (1886, Richardsonian Romanesque) - latter now Boston Architectural College
 Fisher Hill Reservoir, Brookline, Massachusetts (1887)
 Dorchester Temple Baptist Church (1889, shingle style)
 Calais Free Library, Calais, Maine (opened July 4, 1893)
 158, 160, 162, 164, 166, 168, 170, 172, 174, St. Botolph Street, Boston, MA  (1894)
 apartment building, 492–498 Massachusetts Avenue and 779–781 Tremont Street, South End, Boston (1897)
 69, 71, 73, 75, 77, 79, 81, 83, 85, 87, 89, 91, 93, 95, 97, 99, 101, 103, 015, 107, 109, 111, 113 Gainsborough Street, Boston, MA (1900)
 114, 116, 118, 120 Hemenway Street, Boston, MA (1900)
 76. 78. 80. 82. 84. 86. 88. 90. 92, 94, 96, 98, 100, 102, 104, 106, 108, 110  Gainsborough Street, Boston, MA (1902)
 Globe Theater (burlesque and later B movie house), later known as the Center and the Pagoda, 690 Washington Street, Boston (1903, French Renaissance)

Images

References

 National Register nomination for Bowditch School, Jamaica Plain
 Biography of Henry F. Starbuck
 Dorchester Atheneum
 History of Chestnut Hill Reservation, Mass. Department of Conservation and Recreation
 Spaulding & Slye Colliers press release

External links
 https://www.flickr.com/photos/tomewatson/2344423886/ Globe Theatre, Washington St., Boston. It was later the Center and then the Pagoda. The theater closed in 1995
 https://www.flickr.com/photos/army_arch/3550844921/

1854 births
1923 deaths
Architects from Boston
19th century in Boston